Bel-Red/130th station will be an at-grade Sound Transit East Link light rail station in the Bel-Red area of Bellevue, Washington. It is expected to open along with the section of the line to Overlake in 2024. In February 2017, Sound Transit awarded a $93 million construction contract for the station and nearby bridge to the Max J. Kuney Company.

Location 
The station will be located on NE 16th Street between 130th and 132nd avenues NE in northeastern Bellevue. A 300-stall park and ride lot is planned to be included with the station.

Design 
The station will consist of two side platforms situated at-grade in the median of Spring Boulevard.

An early design proposed by Tiscareno Associates using rusted steel for the shelters, reflecting the area's industrial history, but was rejected by community members. The revised design takes inspiration from nearby water features.

References 

Future Link light rail stations
Link light rail stations in King County, Washington
Buildings and structures in Bellevue, Washington
Railway stations scheduled to open in 2024